

Public institutions
University of Ljubljana, Ljubljana
University of Maribor, Maribor
University of Primorska, Koper

Private institutions
New University, Ljubljana, Ljubljana
Alma Mater Europaea - Evropski center, Maribor, Maribor, Ljubljana, Murska Sobota
University of Novo Mesto, Novo Mesto
University of Nova Gorica, Nova Gorica

See also
List of colleges and universities
List of colleges and universities by country

External links
List of higher education institutions in Slovenia

 
Universities
Slovenia
Slovenia